WQOK (97.5 FM) is a commercial radio station licensed to Carrboro, North Carolina, and serving the Raleigh/Durham radio market. WQOK is owned and operated by Urban One and airs an urban contemporary radio format, featuring hip hop and R&B music. Its studios and offices are located on Creedmoor Road in Raleigh. Its transmitter tower is in Oak Grove, just east of Durham.

Each weekday, WQOK carries the "Headkrack Morning Show," syndicated from Atlanta. Local DJs are heard the rest of the day. WQOK broadcasts in the HD radio format.

History

WHLF-FM and WJLC
On October 1, 1960, the station signed on as WHLF-FM in South Boston, Virginia. It was the FM counterpart to AM 1400 WHLF (now WAJL), with the two stations simulcasting their programming. WHLF-FM was powered at only 2,400 watts, limiting its coverage to just South Boston and adjacent communities.

In the 1970s, it changed its call sign to WJLC, airing an automated Top 40 format separate from the co-owned AM station. The power was increased to 29,000 watts but only using a 250-foot tower, so it still did not cover the Raleigh-Durham market. In the 1980s, it switched to a soft adult contemporary/MOR sound, but the power and antenna height remained the same.

Moving to Raleigh
In 1987, radio entrepreneur and syndicated morning radio host Tom Joyner purchased the station, under the corporate name "Power Broadcasting." The format was switched to urban contemporary, using the call letters WQOK along with their new moniker as "The All New K-Power 97.5 FM". He also upgraded WQOK's effective radiated power to 100,000 watts, the maximum power permitted by the Federal Communications Commission (FCC), although the city of license remained as South Boston.

The new tower and coverage area gave WQOK a "city grade" signal over South Boston as required by the FCC, and also put a strong signal around the Triangle as well. Closing down the original South Boston studios, the station signed on from brand new facilities in Raleigh. By winter 1991, WQOK claimed the number one spot in the Arbitron ratings.

Sale to Clear Channel
In 1989, Joyner sold the station to Four Chiefs, Inc., owned by noted African-American broadcast executive Ragan Henry. Henry owned the station for seven years and sold it to Clear Channel Communications in May 1996.

In 2000, as a result of a merger between Clear Channel and another owner of radio stations, AMFM, the new larger company wanted to spin off some of its stations. WQOK was sold to Radio One (now called Urban One), along with current sister stations 107.1 WFXC, 104.3 WFXK, and 103.9 WNNL. The sale meant that once again, the station is under African-American ownership.

Changing the City of License
In 2007, WQOK asked the FCC to move its city of license to Carrboro, put the transmitter on a tower in Durham and decrease from Class C1 to C2. This dropped the power from 100,000 watts to 50,000 watts and all but eliminated coverage of Virginia.

But with the tower moved to the center of the Research Triangle, listeners in offices and apartment buildings likely get a clearer signal. It also reduces a short-spacing issue with WWWV in Charlottesville, Virginia, which also broadcasts on 97.5 MHz. The station's new tower is shared with WFXC.

WQOK had carried the syndicated Russ Parr Morning Show. In January 2016, Parr was replaced by The Rickey Smiley Morning Show, which is syndicated by parent company Urban One.

References

External links
K-97.5 Online

Urban One stations
QOK
Urban contemporary radio stations in the United States